Dujiang class tug is a class of little known medium harbor tug (YTM) built in the People’s Republic of China (PRC) for the People's Liberation Army Navy (PLAN). The exact domestic Chinese type designation remain unknown, and this class is identified by its NATO reporting name Dujiang class, or 渡江 in Chinese, meaning Crossing the River. Dujiang class is a design with a single deck and two levels of superstructures, with a semi-enclosed platform atop the second level.

Nomenclature 
Dujiang class in PLAN service is designated by a combination of two Chinese characters followed by three-digit number. The second Chinese character is Tuo (拖), meaning Tug in Chinese. The first Chinese character denotes which fleet the ship is service with, with East (Dong, 东) for East Sea Fleet, North (Bei, 北) for North Sea Fleet, and South (Nan, 南) for South Sea Fleet. However, the pennant numbers may have changed due to the change of Chinese naval ships naming convention, or when units have been transferred to different fleets. As of mid 2010s, more than four ships have been identified:

References

Auxiliary ships of the People's Liberation Army Navy
Auxiliary tugboat classes
Ships of the People's Liberation Army Navy